Frederick Dudley Vaughan Narborough (called Dudley; 13 June 189521 January 1966) was an eminent Anglican bishop in the mid-twentieth century.

Educated at Norwich School and Worcester College, Oxford; he was deaconed at Michaelmastide 1921 (18 September) and priested the next Michaelmas (24 September 1922) — both times by Hubert Burge, Bishop of Oxford, at Christ Church Cathedral, Oxford, and began his ecclesiastical career as Chaplain at his old college. After this he was Resident Chaplain to Randall Davidson, Archbishop of Canterbury; a Canon Residentiary at Bristol Cathedral; and then Provost of Southwark Cathedral before a 20-year spell as Bishop of Colchester. Until 1959, he was also Archdeacon of Colchester, after then he was also an honorary canon of Chelmsford Cathedral. He was consecrated a bishop on All Saints' Day 1946 (1 November) at Westminster Abbey;

References

Bibliography
 

 

1895 births
People educated at Norwich School
Fellows of Worcester College, Oxford
Provosts and Deans of Southwark
Bishops of Colchester
20th-century Church of England bishops
1966 deaths